(The) Desperate Mission may refer to:

 Desperate Mission (1965 film), a 1965 Italian-Spanish-French Eurospy film
 The Desperate Mission (1969 film), a 1969 American television film